Roxborough Park is an unincorporated community and a census-designated place (CDP) located in and governed by Douglas County, Colorado, United States. The CDP is a part of the Denver–Aurora–Lakewood, CO Metropolitan Statistical Area. The population of the Roxborough Park CDP was 9,099 at the United States Census 2010. The Roxborough Village Metropolitan District and the Roxborough Water and Sanitation District provide services. The Littleton post office (Zip Code 80125) serves the area.

Geography
Roxborough Park sits at the foot of the Front Range of the Rocky Mountains. The Dakota Hogback, a prominent sandstone ridge, runs north–south through the community. The CDP is bordered to the west by Pike National Forest, and Roxborough State Park, known for its dramatic sandstone formations, is on the southern edge of the community.

Demographics

Education
The Douglas County School District serves Roxborough Park.

Places of interest
Roxborough is situated next to Pike National Forest, two state parks and an abundance of recreational opportunities. It is also host to historical and archaeological sites. Roxborough State Park is to the south, with abundant wildlife, red rock formations and connections to multiple trail systems. Chatfield State Park is slightly farther to the north, with boating, fishing, camping, horseback riding, an off-leash dog park, remote-control flying field and an extensive trail system. Waterton Canyon (on the South Platte River) and the High Line Canal are owned by Denver Water and offer a beautiful road and trail system for hikers, runners, cyclists and equestrians.

In 1960, while digging a pond, Charles Lamb discovered Columbian mammoth remains on what is now Lamb Spring, the site of one of the largest collection of mammoth bones in the state.

Arrowhead Golf Club is one of the most scenic golf courses in the Greater Denver area, and a popular venue for weddings and events.

See also

Outline of Colorado
Index of Colorado-related articles
State of Colorado
Colorado cities and towns
Colorado census designated places
Colorado counties
Douglas County, Colorado
List of statistical areas in Colorado
Front Range Urban Corridor
North Central Colorado Urban Area
Denver-Aurora-Boulder, CO Combined Statistical Area
Denver-Aurora-Broomfield, CO Metropolitan Statistical Area
Dakota Hogback
Roxborough State Park
Pike National Forest

References

External links

Roxborough Park @ UncoverColorado.com
Roxborough Village Metropolitan District
Roxborough Water and Sanitation District
Roxborough Park Foundation
Roxborough Living
Roxborough Area Historical Society
Roxborough State Park 
Chatfield State Park
Arrowhead Golf Club
Douglas County website
Douglas County School District

Census-designated places in Douglas County, Colorado
Census-designated places in Colorado
Denver metropolitan area